Ljung and Annelund is a locality situated in Herrljunga Municipality, Västra Götaland County, Sweden. It had 1,215 inhabitants in 2020. The locality was formed by Statistics Sweden from the separate localities of Ljung and Annelund between 2010 and 2015.

The locality is home to a train station named Ljung on the Älvsborg Line.

Sports
The following sports clubs are located in Ljung and Annelund:

 Annelunds IF

References 

Populated places in Västra Götaland County
Populated places in Herrljunga Municipality